Mary Kingdon Heslop (1885-1955) was an Egyptian-born geologist and geographer. She was the first women lecturer in geography at Leeds University, and one of the first women Fellows of the Geological Society of London.

Life
Mary Kingdon Heslop was born and brought up in Egypt. She graduated in physics and geology from Armstrong College, Durham in 1906. She remained there as a research fellow. In 1909 she gained a M.Sc in 1909 for her work on igneous petrology, in which she pioneered the use of colour photomicrography and published several papers on the igneous dykes of Northern England. After becoming a demonstrator at Newcastle, she moved to Bedford College, London under Catherine Raisin. 

Facing a lack of career opportunities in geology, Heslop took a one-year postgraduate diploma in geography at Oxford University in 1916. She taught at Church High School, Newcastle from 1916 until about 1921. On 3 December 1919 she was elected a Fellow of the Geological Society of London. From c.1920 to 1922 she was assistant lecturer in geography at Leeds University. From 1923 to 1950 she was a full-time lecturer at the Kenton Lodge Teacher Training College in Newcastle.

Heslop was an active member of the Geographical Association committees in Newcastle and Leeds.

Works
 'On some elementary forms of crystallisation in the igneous dykes of Northumberland and Durham'. Proceedings of the University Of Durham Philosophical Society, Vol. 3 (1908), pp.37-46
 (with J. A. Smythe) 'The Dyke at Crookdene (Northumberland) and its Relations with the Collywell, Tynemouth and Morpeth Dykes'. Quarterly Journal of the Geological Society of London, Vol. 66, Part 1 (1910), pp.1-18
 'A preliminary note on the uniaxial augites of the north of England igneous dykes'. Proceedings Of The University Of Durham Philosophical Society, Vol. 4 (1912), pp.172-174
 (with R. C. Burton) 'The tachylite of the Cleveland dyke'. Geological Magazine of London, dec. 5, Vol. 9 (1912), pp. 60-69
 'The Trade of the Tyne', The Geographical Teacher, Vol. 10, No. 1 (Spring 1919), pp.12-20

References

Further reading
 'Obituary - Mary Kingdon Heslop'. Proceedings of the Geological Society of London, part 1529 (1955), pp.139–140

1885 births
1955 deaths
20th-century geographers
Women geographers
Academics of the University of Leeds
Fellows of the Geological Society of London
Alumni of Armstrong College, Durham
Alumni of Bedford College, London
British expatriates in Egypt